An appoggiatura (or) is a musical ornament that consists of an added non-chord note in a melody that is resolved to the regular note of the chord. By putting the non-chord tone on a strong beat, (typically the first or third beats of the measure, in 4/4 time) this accents the appoggiatura note, which also delays the appearance of the principal, expected chord note. The added non-chord note, or auxiliary note, is typically one degree higher or lower than the principal note, and may be chromatically altered. An appoggiatura may be added to a melody in a vocal song or in an instrumental work.

The term comes from the Italian verb , "to lean upon". The appoggiatura is often used to express emotional "yearning". It is also called a long appoggiatura to distinguish it from the short appoggiatura, the acciaccatura. An ascending appoggiatura was previously known as a forefall, while a descending appoggiatura was known as a backfall.

Notation

The appoggiatura is often written as a grace note prefixed to a principal note and printed in small character, usually without the oblique stroke:

This may be executed as follows:

The same notation can be used for other interpretations of the grace note; therefore determining that an appoggiatura is intended depends on performance practice.

An appoggiatura may also be notated precisely as it should be performed, with full-size notes, to reduce ambiguity.

Unaccented appoggiatura

So-called unaccented appoggiaturas are also quite common in many periods of music, even though they are disapproved of by some early theorists (for example, by C. P. E. Bach, in his ). While not being identical with the acciaccatura, these are almost always quite short, and take their time from the allocation for the note that precedes them. They are more likely to be seen as full-size notes in the score, rather than in small character – at least in modern editions.

Double appoggiatura

The double appoggiatura (Ital. Appoggiatura doppia; Ger. Doppelvorschlag; Fr. Port de voix double) is an ornament composed of two short notes preceding a principal note, one placed above and the other below it. They are usually written as small sixteenth notes.

The first of the two may be at any distance from the principal note, but the second is only one degree removed from it. They have no fixed duration, but are generally slower when applied to a long note (Ex. 1) than when the principal note is short (Ex. 2); moreover, the double appoggiatura, in which the first note lies at a distance from the principal note, should always be somewhat slower than that in which both notes are close to it (Ex. 3). In all cases, the time required for both notes is subtracted from the value of the principal note.

The double appoggiatura is sometimes, though rarely, met with in an inverted form (Ex. 4), and C. P. E. Bach mentions another exceptional kind, in which the first of the two small notes is dotted, and receives the whole accent, while the principal note becomes as short as the second of the two small notes (Ex. 5)

The dotted double appoggiatura, written as above, is of very rare occurrence.

Appoggiaturas approached by step 

Although appoggiaturas are often approached by leap and resolved by step, there are examples of approached and resolution both taking place by step.

One such example is present in Schubert's "Wiegenlied" D. 867:

Examples in popular music 
Appoggiaturias can also be found in many popular songs as they grab a listener's attention especially when placed in the vocal melody.

Beatles' songs that make use of this technique (appoggiaturias underlined in the sung syllables below):

"Yesterday":

Yes - ter - day, all my troubles seemed so far away.

Now it looks as though they're here to stay...

-"Yes" (G note over F major chord)

-"far" (E note over D minor chord) 

-"here" (Bb note over F major chord)

"In My Life":

There are pla - ces I'll re - mem - ber,   

all my li - ife, though some have changed...

-"Pla" (B note over A major chord)

-"mem" (E note over F# minor chord)

-"li" (D note over B major chord)

Ornamentation